Robertson Buttress is the westernmost (1040 m) in a series of large rock buttresses on the south side of Darwin Glacier between Alley Glacier and Gaussiran Glacier. It was named by the Advisory Committee on Antarctic Names (US-ACAN) after William Gray Robertson, Jr. of ASA, a specialist in the design and installation of communication systems for United States Antarctic Program (USAP) in the McMurdo Sound and McMurdo Dry Valleys areas from 1990 to 2000.

Rock formations of Oates Land